"I Got the Keys" is a song by American musician DJ Khaled featuring American rappers Jay-Z and Future. It was released on July 4, 2016 by We the Best Music Group and Epic Records as the second single of Khaled's ninth studio album, Major Key (2016). In December 2016, the song was certified platinum by the Recording Industry Association of America (RIAA), for selling over a million digital copies in the United States.

Music video
The song's music video premiered after the BET Awards on June 26, 2016. The video features cameo appearances by Rick Ross, 2 Chainz, Pusha T, ASAP Ferg, T.I., Swizz Beatz, Busta Rhymes, Fabolous, Yo Gotti, Bryson Tiller and Zoey Dollaz.

Track listing

Charts

Weekly charts

Year-end charts

Certifications

Release history

References

2016 songs
2016 singles
DJ Khaled songs
Songs written by DJ Khaled
Jay-Z songs
Songs written by Jay-Z
Songs written by Future (rapper)
Future (rapper) songs
Black-and-white music videos
Song recordings produced by DJ Khaled
Song recordings produced by Southside (record producer)
Songs written by Southside (record producer)